Ms. Soul is an album by American jazz vocalist Dakota Staton recorded in 1974 and released on the Groove Merchant label.

Track listing
All compositions by Dakota Staton except where noted.
 "Play Your Hands, Girls" – 3:33
 "I'd Go Back Home" – 4:14
 "Porgy" (Jimmy McHugh, Dorothy Fields) – 3:14
 "Hurry Home" – 2:36
 "Little Man (You've Had a Busy Day)" (Al Hoffman, Maurice Sigler, Mabel Wayne) – 3:12
 "Between 18th and 19th on Chestnut Street" (Will Osborne, Dick Rogers) – 3:19
 "Why Don't You Think Things Over" (Lillian Friedlander, Honey Friedlander) – 3:32
 "A Nightingale Sang in Berkeley Square" (Manning Sherwin, Eric Maschwitz) – 3:00
 "He Will Call Again" (Gladys Shelley) – 4:24
 "Save This Love Affair" – 5:24

Personnel
Dakota Staton − vocals
Peter Loeb – tenor saxophone, soprano saxophone
Norman Simmons – piano
Bob Cunningham – bass
Qasim Bobby Hamilton – drums

References

Groove Merchant albums
Dakota Staton albums
1974 albums
Albums produced by Sonny Lester